The Monts Otish (Otish Mountains) are a range of tall hills in the geographic centre of Quebec, Canada, north of Lac Mistassini and Manicouagan Reservoir.  Within the tall hills is the Réserve faunique des Lacs-Albanel-Mistassini-et-Waconichi.

Mountain ranges of Quebec
Landforms of Nord-du-Québec